Thandi Gloria Mpambo-Sibhukwana (died 19 June 2020) was a South African educator and legislator. She was a permanent delegate to the National Council of Provinces from 2014 to 2019 and a Member of the National Assembly of South Africa from 2019 until her death in 2020. She was a member of the Democratic Alliance (DA) and a member of the Portfolio Committee on Social Development.

Career
Mpambo-Sibhukwana worked as an isiXhosa teacher at Wynberg Girls' High School until 2010 when she accepted a position at the Western Cape provincial government.

Political career
She joined the Democratic Alliance and became a Member of the National Council of Provinces, the upper house of parliament, in May 2014. She was part of the Western Cape provincial delegation. Mpambo-Sibhukwana was elected to lower house, the National Assembly, in May 2019.

DA parliamentary leader Mmusi Maimane appointed her shadow deputy minister of social development, as she was assigned to serve on the Portfolio Committee on Social Development. Her constituency was the Drakenstein and Saldanha Bay from 2014 until 2019. She was elected head of the Oostenberg South constituency in 2019.

Death
Mpambo-Sibhukwana died on 19 June 2020 in Cape Town from Covid-19. She is survived by her two daughters. The Democratic Alliance, Wynberg Girls' High School and Parliament all released statements in which they praised Mpambo-Sibhukwana.

References

External links

2020 deaths
Xhosa people
People from the Western Cape
Year of birth missing
Place of birth missing
South African educators
21st-century South African politicians
21st-century South African women politicians
Politicians from Cape Town
Democratic Alliance (South Africa) politicians
Members of the National Assembly of South Africa
Members of the National Council of Provinces
Women members of the National Council of Provinces
Deaths from the COVID-19 pandemic in South Africa